The Israel Sailing Association (also known as the Israel Yachting Association; איגוד השייט בישראל) is the national governing body for the sport of sailing in Israel, recognized by the International Sailing Federation. Former Olympian Yehuda Maayan became Chairman of the Israel Sailing Association in 1992. Former Olympian Eli Zuckerman is the Chairman of the Professional Committee of the Israel Sailing Association.

References

External links
 Official website

Sports organizations established in 1950
Israel
Sailing
1950 establishments in Israel
 Sailing in Israel